Compelled is a 1960 British neo noir black and white crime film, one of two films directed by Ramsey Herrington. It stars Ronald Howard and Beth Rogan.

Plot
Ex-con Paul Adams is an engineer blackmailed into assisting with a jewel theft. Unbeknownst to his wife, he becomes involved in the building of a tunnel from a bookshop to a jeweller's.

Cast
 Ronald Howard as Paul Adams
 Beth Rogan as Carol
 John Gabriel as Fenton
 Richard Shaw as Jug
 Jack Melford as Grimes
 Mark Singleton as Derek
 Colin Tapley as Inspector
 Stella Bonheur as Mrs Mills
 Wilfred Grantham as Customer
 Garard Green as Reporter
 John Stuart as Book Man
 Totti Truman Taylor as Lady

Critical reception
TV Guide wrote, "there's nothing special about this British programmer"; while Britmovie called the film an "unexceptional second-feature crime drama."

References

External links
 

1960 films
1960 crime films
British crime films
British black-and-white films
Films shot at New Elstree Studios
1960s English-language films
1960s British films